Mohammad Aamir Zulfiqar Khan is a Pakistani civil servant who has served as Inspector General (IGP) of the Punjab Police from December 2022 to January 2023.

Career
In the midst of political turmoil in Punjab, Khan was appointed as the new Punjab Inspector General (IG) by the federal government, replacing Faisal Shahkar. The announcement of his appointment was made through a formal notification by the Establishment Division, which stated that Khan is currently serving as the Deputy Director General of the Anti-Narcotics Force (ANF).

Zulfiqar has held various significant positions within the police force, including IG of National Highways and Motorway Police, IG of Islamabad Police, Punjab Additional IG Operations, DIG Operations Lahore, RPO Multan, DIG CTD Punjab, DIG Operations, and CPO Punjab. He has also served in other regions such as Sindh, Punjab, Khyber-Pakhtunkhwa, and the federal government.

He belonging to the 19th Common of Pakistan Administrative Service.

References

Living people
Inspector Generals of the Punjab Police (Pakistan)
Pakistani civil servants